Sir Thomas Hele, 1st Baronet ( 1595 to 7 November 1670) was a landowner from Devon and MP on various occasions from 1626 to 1670. A Royalist during the 1642 to 1646 First English Civil War, he raised a regiment of cavalry which served in the West Country and sat in the Oxford Parliament.

Heavily fined by the Committee for Compounding with Delinquents, he avoided participation in politics during the Interregnum and after the Stuart Restoration in May 1660 was elected to the Cavalier Parliament. He died at home in Holbeton on 7 November 1670.

Personal details
Thomas Hele was the second surviving son of Thomas Hele (1568-1624) and Bridget Champernowne, 4th daughter of Sir Henry Champernowne (1538–1570) of Modbury in Devon. He became heir when his father disinherited his eldest son Samwell (1590-1661). 

In 1629, he married Penelope Jackson (?-1630), who died in childbirth the next year, leaving him a son Thomas Hele (1630–1665). Elizabeth Elwes (?-1646)became his second wife in 1632 and they had nine children, only four of whom survived into adulthood; Samuel (1634-1672), Henry (1636-1677), Elizabeth (1638-1691) and Honor (1639-1710).

Career

In 1626 Hele was elected Member of Parliament for Plympton Erle. He was created Baronet of Fleet in the County of Devon in the Baronetage of England on 28 May 1627.  He was re-elected in 1628; Parliament was dissolved and sat until it was dissolved in 1629, ushering in the eleven years of Personal Rule.  

Following the death of the previous incumbent, he was appointed Sheriff of Devon in January 1636, making him responsible for collecting Ship Money. He was elected for Plympton to the Short Parliament in April 1640, then the Long Parliament in November. 

When the First English Civil War began in August 1642, Hele supported Charles I; he sat in the Oxford Parliament and was excluded from his Parliamentary seat in January 1644. He also raised a regiment of cavalry, taking part in the Siege of Plymouth and defence of Pendennis Castle. He was heavily fined by the Committee for Compounding with Delinquents in 1646 and largely avoided participation in Royalist conspiracies during the Interregnum. Following the Stuart Restoration, he was elected for Okehampton in the Cavalier Parliament and held the seat until his death in 1670. 

Hele was buried in All Saints' Church, Holbeton, on 16 November 1670. His elaborate monument survives in the Fleet Chapel, at the east end of the north aisle of the church.

Notes

References

Sources
 
 
 

 

 

1590s births
1670 deaths
Military personnel from Devon
Baronets in the Baronetage of England
High Sheriffs of Devon
English MPs 1626
English MPs 1628–1629
English MPs 1640 (April)
English MPs 1640–1648
English MPs 1661–1679
Thomas
Members of the Parliament of England for Plympton Erle
Members of the Parliament of England for Okehampton
Members of the Inner Temple
Royalist military personnel of the English Civil War
People from South Hams (district)